Fish Island is an island in the U.S. state of Massachusetts. The island is located in the Acushnet River and within the city of New Bedford.

The USRC Salmon P. Chase (1878) was at one time moored here, where she served as a berthing area for the cadets of the United States Revenue Cutter Service at the Revenue Cutter Service School of Instruction.  The Revenue Cutter Service School of Instruction was the forerunner of the United States Coast Guard Academy.

See also
Fish Island (disambiguation), for other places by this name

Coastal islands of Massachusetts
Islands of Bristol County, Massachusetts
New Bedford, Massachusetts